Fratelli Tanfoglio S.N.C. is an Italian firearms manufacturing company. Their current weapons are used extensively in sport competitions and for personal defence. Tanfoglio is located in Gardone Val Trompia (Brescia), and is known for its broad sport pistol catalogue. Tanfoglio Pistols are popular firearms across Europe; they also are imported into United States by the Italian Firearms Group (IFG) and in Australia by NVT Pty Ltd.

History
The Tanfoglio Company was founded in the 1940s just after World War II. The production started with gun parts such as receivers and hammers. After 8 years the firm "Fabbrica d'armi Tanfoglio Giuseppe" was founded. As time progressed the company activity expanded and started to produce replica guns and handguns of their own design like Tanfoglio GT27. In the 1980s Tanfoglio started to produce clones of CZ 75 made for IPSC and action shooting. Tanfoglio has also produced the single-shot Thor handgun for metallic silhouette shooting. Nowadays the Tanfoglio factory produces approximately 90,000 pistols per year of which 85% are exported. Related brand names include FIE and EXCAM.

Subcontractor for Israel Military Industries
The original Israel Military Industries (IMI) Jericho 941 (CZ 75 copy) semi-automatic pistols were built using parts supplied by the Italian arms house Tanfoglio. Using a well-tested design allowed IMI to avoid the teething problems most new pistol designs experience, and subcontracting much of the basic fabrication work to Tanfoglio allowed IMI to quickly and economically put into production a pistol that would have enough Israeli content to satisfy government contract requirements.

European importer for Caracal International L.L.C.
Since 2009 Tanfoglio is the European importer for the Caracal pistol product line. These polymer framed semi-automatic pistols are produced by Caracal International L.L.C. from the United Arab Emirates and have been introduced on the Italian civilian/sport shooters market during the 2009 EXA expo (Brescia, 18–21 April 2009).

Gallery

See also
 List of firearms
 List of pistols
 Tanfoglio Combat and Standard
 Tanfoglio Force
TZ 75

References

External links
 
 

Firearm manufacturers of Italy
Privately held companies of Italy

Manufacturing companies established in 1948
Italian companies established in 1948
Italian brands